The 2006–07 season will be Ferencvárosi TC's1st competitive season, 1st consecutive season in the Nemzeti Bajnokság II and 107th year in existence as a football club.

Squad

Transfers

Summer

In:

Out:

Source:

Winter

In:

Out:

Source:

Pre–season and friendlies

Competitions

Overview

Nemzeti Bajnokság II

League table

Results summary

Results by round

Matches

Hungarian Cup

Statistics

Appearances and goals
Last updated on 16 June 2007.

|-
|colspan="14"|Youth players:

|-
|colspan="14"|Out to loan:

|-
|colspan="14"|Players no longer at the club:
|}

Top scorers
Includes all competitive matches. The list is sorted by shirt number when total goals are equal.
Last updated on 16 June 2007

Disciplinary record
Includes all competitive matches. Players with 1 card or more included only.

Last updated on 16 June 2007

Clean sheets
Last updated on 16 June 2007

References

External links
 Official Website
 UEFA
 fixtures and results

2006-07
Hungarian football clubs 2006–07 season